Jett Hayward (born (22 April 1997) is an American rugby union player. She plays for the United States internationally and for Life West Gladiatrix in the WPL.

Hayward is a Program Coordinator & Special Projects Associate at Stanford Impact Labs. She attended Stanford University where she began her rugby; she graduated in 2019 with a bachelor's degree in International Relations.

Hayward was selected in the Eagles squad for the delayed 2021 Rugby World Cup in New Zealand.

References

External links 

 Jett Hayward at USA Rugby

Living people
1997 births
Female rugby union players
American female rugby union players
United States women's international rugby union players